Liangzi gui (浪子歸, in English variously known as The Return of the Vagabond, The Prodigal Returns, and other unofficial translations) was Cui Jian's first album in 1984. It originally circulated as a cassette, then was released in Hong Kong and Taiwan only. Cui regarded the CD as a collection of demos and performances, not as his first album. In 2009 the tracks from the Hong Kong release were reissued in Beijing with other early recordings, indicating "The sound of Cui Jian in 1986" on the cover, as a CD.

References

1984 albums
Cui Jian albums
Mandarin-language albums